Zandwerven (West Frisian: Sandwerfen) is a hamlet in the Dutch province of North Holland. It is a part of the municipality of Opmeer, and lies about 8 km east of Heerhugowaard.

The hamlet was first mentioned in 1653 as "op Sandwerven", and means "terp (artificial living hill) on the sand". Zandwerven is the site of a Neolithic settlement, and artefacts have been recovered from 1,700 Before Christ.

Zandwerven has place name signs. It was home to 108 people in 1840.

References

Populated places in North Holland
Opmeer